"I Don't Know a Thing About Love (The Moon Song)" is a song written by Harlan Howard and recorded by the American country music artist Conway Twitty with backing vocals by Twitty's daughter Joni Lee. It was released in July 1984, as the second single from the album By Heart. The song was Twitty's 48th number-one overall country hit. In the US, the single went to number one for one week and spent a total of 14 weeks on the country chart.

Cover version
The song was covered by the American country music artist Cody Johnson for his 2021 album, Human: The Double Album.

Charts

Weekly charts

Year-end charts

References

1984 songs
1984 singles
Conway Twitty songs
Cody Johnson songs
Songs written by Harlan Howard
Warner Records singles